Oakhurst (formerly Fresno Flats) is a census-designated place (CDP) in Madera County, California, United States,  south of the entrance to Yosemite National Park, in the foothills of the Sierra Nevada. At the 2020 census, the population was 5,945, up from 2,829 at the 2010 census. It is part of the Madera metropolitan statistical area.

Geography
It is located at the junction of state highways 41 and 49, at the southern end of California's Gold Country. Nearby communities include Ahwahnee, Coarsegold and Bass Lake.

History

Native people
Oakhurst was a common meeting ground for the Miwoks, Yokuts, and Monos before the time of the California Gold Rush. 

Many Native Californians were displaced by white settlers following the enactment of the Act for the Government and Protection of Indians in 1850. This act facilitated the removal and displacement of Native Californian Indians from their traditional lands, and led to the Mariposa War, the first battle of which was fought near present-day Oakhurst on January 11, 1851. By June 1851, most Native Americans in the region had been relocated to the Fresno River Farm Reservation, opening the region to the first permanent white settlers.

Fresno Flats
Oakhurst's existence began in 1858 as "Fresno Flats", named for the Spanish word for ash trees and flat, a colloquial term for a mountain meadow.

Fresno Flats founding was not precipitated by the discovery of precious metals, unlike most other nearby towns founded in the nineteenth century along what came to be known as the Golden Chain Highway.

A rancher named John Robert Nichols is believed to be the first Anglo settler to permanently settle in the area in 1858. He was soon joined by others who raised hogs and sheep and planted orchards, making Fresno Flats a permanent settlement. The first post office opened in 1873. In 1874, the Madera Flume and Lumber Company began construction of a log flume alongside the Fresno River that gave rise to the local timber industry.  In 1876, the wagon road from Madera to Yosemite was completed. From that point onward, tourism would steadily become the chief economic activity of the area.

Name change
Fresno Flats lost its name in 1912 after a resident secretly petitioned the town be renamed over fear that the town’s reputation was forever tarnished because of a local stagecoach robbery. The town was renamed Oakhurst by an Act of Congress that took most people in town by surprise.

Sierra On-Line
The pioneering computer game developer Sierra On-Line was based in Oakhurst from 1981 to 1999. The company achieved many industry firsts, including the development of the first 3D adventure game (King's Quest, 1984) and one of the first online gaming networks (The Sierra Network, 1989).

Demographics

2010
At the 2010 census Oakhurst had a population of 2,829. The racial makeup of Oakhurst was 2,532 (89.5%) White, 473 (16.7%) Hispanic or Latino, 22 (0.8%) African American, 61 (2.2%) Native American, 44 (1.6%) Asian, 3 (0.1%) Pacific Islander, 66 (2.3%) from other races, and 101 (3.6%) from two or more races.

The census reported that 2,772 people (98.0% of the population) lived in households, no one lived in non-institutionalized group quarters and 57 (2.0%) were institutionalized.

There were 1,226 households, 301 (24.6%) had children under the age of 18 living in them, 515 (42.0%) were opposite-sex married couples living together, 153 (12.5%) had a female householder with no husband present, 76 (6.2%) had a male householder with no wife present. There were 61 (5.0%) unmarried opposite-sex partnerships, and 14 (1.1%) same-sex married couples or partnerships. 386 households (31.5%) were one person and 216 (17.6%) had someone living alone who was 65 or older. The average household size was 2.26. There were 744 families (60.7% of households); the average family size was 2.80.

The age distribution was 526 people (18.6%) under the age of 18, 228 people (8.1%) aged 18 to 24, 567 people (20.0%) aged 25 to 44, 758 people (26.8%) aged 45 to 64, and 750 people (26.5%) who were 65 or older. The median age was 48.4 years. For every 100 females, there were 90.5 males. For every 100 females age 18 and over, there were 86.2 males.

There were 1,379 housing units at an average density of 229.6 per square mile, of the occupied units 691 (56.4%) were owner-occupied and 535 (43.6%) were rented. The homeowner vacancy rate was 3.5%; the rental vacancy rate was 5.5%. 1,485 people (52.5% of the population) lived in owner-occupied housing units and 1,287 people (45.5%) lived in rental housing units.

2000
As of the 2000 census, there were 2,868 people, 1,250 households, and 773 families in the CDP. The racial makeup of the CDP was 87.62% White, 0.45% African American, 2.93% Native American, 1.05% Asian, 0.10% Pacific Islander, 6.03% from other races, and 1.81% from two or more races. Hispanic or Latino of any race were 9.94% of the population.

Of the 1,250 households 23.7% had children under 18 living with them, 44.6% were married couples living together, 12.4% had a female householder with no husband present, and 38.1% were non-families. 31.3% of households were one person and 19.7% were one person aged 65 or older. The average household size was 2.21 and the average family size was 2.72.

The age distribution was 19.7% under the age of 18, 7.9% from 18 to 24, 21.5% from 25 to 44, 24.2% from 45 to 64, and 26.7% 65 or older. The median age was 46 years. For every 100 females, there were 86.0 males. For every 100 females age 18 and over, there were 81.1 males.

The median household income was $27,679 and the median family income was $35,495. Males had a median income of $36,979 versus $21,111 for females. The per capita income for the CDP was $16,851. About 12.8% of families and 17.3% of the population were below the poverty line, including 27.2% of those under age 18 and 10.9% of those age 65 or over.

Government and politics

On February 5, 2008 residents voted on Measure C, a proposal to incorporate Oakhurst as a city. The measure failed with 56% voting against and 44% in favor.

Honorary mayor
Since Oakhurst is not incorporated, it does not have an official mayor. However, an Honorary Mayor is announced each year. To win the race, the candidates raise money for their favorite non-profit organization through various events. Each dollar raised during the campaign counts as a vote; the candidate with the most votes wins the title and duties of the Honorary Mayor of Oakhurst. Over the years the annual Oakhurst Honorary Mayoral Campaign has brought awareness to and raised hundreds of thousands of dollars for many local charities.

Education
Oakhurst is home to Yosemite High School and the headquarters for the Yosemite Unified School District. Many primary schools across eastern Madera County feed into the high school.

Oakhurst Community College Center is a two-year institution that offers programs in two-year degrees and general education for transfer. Founded in the 1980s, it is located on Road 426 off Highway 41, near the local Madera County Library branch . The State Center Community College District Board of Trustees approved plans to relocate the college to a new 30-acre site along Highway 49. Construction is estimated to cost $25 million and be completed by spring 2022.

Culture

Historic buildings

The Little Church on the Hill was built in 1894 and moved from Chapel Hill to its current location in Oakhill Cemetery in 1957. Built from sugar pine lumber from the local mills, it was the first house of worship in Fresno Flats and met the needs of all denominations for over 50 years. The church and cemetery were designated as California Point of Historical Interest in 1994.

Many original pioneer structures are on display at the Fresno Flats Historical Village and Park including the 1869 Taylor Log House, where Boot Taylor, one of the first Sierra National Forest rangers was raised, the two-story Laramore-Layman House, built in the 1870s, the Raymond Jail built in 1890, and several single-room schoolhouses.

Infrastructure

Transportation

Highway 41 connects Oakhurst to Fresno and Yosemite. Highway 49 has its southern terminus at Highway 41 in Oakhurst and connects to Mariposa.

Oakhurst is served by the YARTS Highway 41 bus route between Fresno and Yosemite, and by the Madera County Connection bus system, which travels to Madera and Bass Lake.

Utilities
Cable television services for the town of Oakhurst are contracted to Vyve Broadband .

Sierra Telephone Company, which serves northern Madera County and much of adjoining Mariposa County, is based in Oakhurst.

Notable people 
 Ted Lilly, MLB pitcher; attended Yosemite High School in Oakhurst
 Lori Martin, actress
 From Indian Lakes, indie rock band

References

External links

Oakhurst Area Chamber of Commerce

Census-designated places in Madera County, California
Populated places established in 1873
Census-designated places in California